Nagia melipotica is a species of moth in the family Erebidae. It is found in South Africa.

References

Endemic moths of South Africa
Nagia
Moths described in 1926
Moths of Africa